An anti-king, anti king or antiking is a would-be king who, due to succession disputes or simple political opposition, declares himself king in opposition to a reigning monarch.  The term is usually used in a European historical context where it relates to elective monarchies rather than hereditary ones. In hereditary monarchies such figures are more frequently referred to as pretenders or claimants.

Anti-kings are most commonly referred to in the politics of the Holy Roman Empire, before the Golden Bull of 1356 issued by Emperor Charles IV defined the provisions of the Imperial election. Other nations with elective monarchies that produced anti-kings included Bohemia and Hungary. The term is comparable to antipope, a rival would-be Pope, and indeed the two phenomena are related; just as German kings (Kings of the Romans) and Holy Roman Emperors from time to time raised up antipopes to politically weaken Popes with whom they were in conflict, so too Popes sometimes sponsored anti-kings as political rivals to emperors with whom they disagreed.

Several anti-kings succeeded in vindicating their claims to power, and were recognized as rightful kings: for example, King Conrad III of Germany, Emperor Frederick II, and Emperor Charles IV (see table below). The status of others as anti-kings is still disputed: e.g. in the case of Duke Henry II of Bavaria and Margrave Egbert II of Meissen.

List of anti-kings

Germany

German double elections

Bohemia

Hungary

Japan

Korea

Scotland

References

Sources 
 Heinrich Mitteis: Die deutsche Königswahl. Ihre Rechtsgrundlagen bis zur goldenen Bulle, 2nd expanded edition, Rohrer, Brünn, Munich, Vienna, 1944, pp. 113 ff.
 Dietmar Willoweit: Deutsche Verfassungsgeschichte. Vom Frankenreich bis zur Wiedervereinigung Deutschlands, 5th revised edition, expanded with a table of chronology and an attached map, Beck, Munich, 2005, pp. 71 f., 94 ff., 
 Gerhard Theuerkauf: Gegenkönig. In: Handwörterbuch zur deutschen Rechtsgeschichte, 2nd, fully revised and expanded edition. Published by Albrecht Cordes, Heiner Lück, Dieter Werkmüller and Ruth Schmidt-Wiegand as philological advisor. Edited by: Falk Hess and Andreas Karg, Vol. I: Aachen-Geistliche Bank, Erich Schmidt Verlag, Berlin. 2008, Sp. 1995–1996, 

Succession
Monarchs
 
Royal titles